Mount Olivet Cemetery is an historic rural cemetery located at 1300 Bladensburg Road, NE in Washington, D.C. It is maintained by the Roman Catholic Archdiocese of Washington. The largest Catholic burial ground in the District of Columbia, it was one of the first in the city to be racially integrated.

About the cemetery

On June 5, 1852, the Council of the City of Washington in the District of Columbia passed a local ordinance that barred the creation of new cemeteries anywhere within Georgetown or the area bounded by Boundary Street (northwest and northeast), 15th Street (east), East Capitol Street, the Anacostia River, the Potomac River, and Rock Creek. Existing Catholic cemeteries at St. Matthew's Church, St. Patrick Catholic Church, and St. Peter Catholic Church were nearly full. A number of new cemeteries were therefore established in the "rural" areas in and around Washington: Columbian Harmony Cemetery in D.C.; Gate of Heaven Cemetery in Silver Spring, Maryland; Glenwood Cemetery in D.C.; and Woodlawn Cemetery in D.C. Father Charles I. White, the 51-year-old priest who had led St. Matthew's Roman Catholic Church since 1857, was the individual most responsible for the creation of Mt. Olivet.

The cemetery was created in 1858. The Roman Catholic Archdiocese of Baltimore, which then covered the District of Columbia, purchased  of Fenwick Farm for the cemetery. A gray stone lodge was built to mark the entrance. Because the burial grounds at St. Matthew's, St. Patrick, and St. Peter churches were all full by that time, a number of graves were moved to the newly-established Mount Olivet in order to make room at the old cemeteries for new burials.

Mount Auburn Cemetery, a rural cemetery near Boston, Massachusetts, was the model for Mount Olivet. During the late 19th and early 20th centuries, Mount Olivet was known as one of the "big five" cemeteries in Washington, D.C.

From the start, Mount Olivet was racially integrated. Most cemeteries in the city were not.  More than 7,700 African Americans were buried at Mount Olivet between 1800 and 1919 (about 7.6 percent of all African American burials in the city). In comparison, 24,000 Caucasians were buried there during the same period. Mount Olivet was the only racially integrated cemetery from the 19th century to remain active as of 1989, although this changed in 2019 when Holy Rood Cemetery in Georgetown opened a columbarium.

Notable interments

 Timothy T. Ansberry (1871–1943), U.S. Representative from Ohio
 Arizona John Burke (1842–1917), 19th century promoter, press agent, and manager who created the persona and managed the career of William Frederick "Buffalo Bill" Cody
 Thomas Carbery (1791–1863), sixth mayor of Washington, D.C.
 Thomas H. Carter (1854–1911) U.S. Senator (R, Montana)
 Orlando E. Caruana (1844–1917), medal of honor recipient of the American Civil War
 Michael Walsh Cluskey (1832–1873), member of the Confederate States Congress
 Joseph A. Conry (1868–1943), U.S. Representative from Massachusetts
 Sadie Crawford (1885–1965), performer during the early jazz era
 Ralph Hunter Daughton (1885–1958), U.S. Representative from Virginia
 Ella Loraine Dorsey (1853–1935), American author and journalist
 James F. Duhamel (1858–1947), state politician from New York
 Julius P. Garesché (1821–1862), Civil War soldier of the Union Army
 Louis de Geofroy (1822–1899), French diplomat who served as the French ambassador to China
 Floyd Gibbons (1887–1939), war correspondent for the Chicago Tribune during World War I
 John Gilroy (1875–1897), Major League Baseball pitcher and outfielder
 Josefina Guerrero (1917–1996), spy during World War II
 James Hoban (c.1758–1831) Original Architect of the White House, Founding Master of Federal Lodge No. 1
 Jan Karski (1914–2000), Polish World War II resistance movement fighter and later professor at Georgetown University
 Charles A. Korbly (1871–1937), U.S. representative from Indiana
 Stephen Latchford (1883–1974), diplomat and lawyer
 Watty Lee (1879–1936), Major League Baseball player
 Michael Joseph Lenihan (1865–1958), U.S. Army officer during World War I
 John M. Lloyd (c.1835/36–1892), Lincoln assassination government witness
 Seraphim Masi (1797–1884), American silversmith
 William Matthews (1770–1854), seventh President of Georgetown College and first British-America-born Catholic priest
 Joseph McKenna (1843–1926), U.S. Supreme Court justice
 Izydor Modelski (1889–1962) Polish general and spy
 James Mooney (1861–1921), ethnologist, wrote about Cherokee myths and the Ghost Dance
 Jeremiah J. Murphy (1858–1932), U.S. Army soldier during the Indian Wars
 Pola Nirenska (1910–1992), Polish-American modern dancer and wife of Jan Karski
 John J. O'Connor (1904–1978), American historian and educator
 Robert Emmet Odlum (1851–1885), first person to jump from Brooklyn Bridge
 Henry T. Oxnard (1860–1922), president of American Beet Sugar Company
 Francisco Pizarro Martínez (1787–1840), Mexican ambassador to the United States (1837–1840).
 Thomas Devin Reilly (1823–1854), Irish nationalist involved in Young Ireland Movement
 Janet Elizabeth Richards (1859–1948), suffragist, author and lecturer
 Charlie Ross (1885–1950), Harry S. Truman's press secretary
 John Hennessy Saul (1819–1897), American horticulturist and landscape architect
 William Russell Smith (1815–1896), U.S. representative from Alabama
 Mary Surratt (1823–1865), Lincoln assassination conspirator
 James Theodore Talbot (1825–1862), American soldier in the Mexican–American War
 Edward Welsh (1843–1929), Civil War soldier of the Union Army
 Henry Wirz (1822–1865), Confederate officer and convicted war criminal
 Robert Wynne (1851–1922), United States Postmaster General
 One British Commonwealth war grave of a Canadian Army soldier of World War II.
 Zeng Qi (1892–1951), politician in Republican China. The founder and chairman of the Young China Party.

References

Bibliography
Bergheim, Laura. The Washington Historical Atlas: Who Did What, When and Where in the Nation's Capital. Rockville, Md.: Woodbine House, 1992.
Johnson, Abby Arthur. "'The Memory of the Community': A Photographic Album of Congressional Cemetery." Washington History. 4:1 (Spring/Summer 1992), pp. 26–45.
Rash, Bryson B. Footnote Washington: Tracking the Engaging, Humorous, and Surprising Bypaths of Capital History. McLean, Va.: EPM Publications, 1983.
Richardson, Steven J. "The Burial Grounds of Black Washington: 1880–1919." Records of the Columbia Historical Society. 52 (1989), pp. 304–326.
Truett, Randle Bond. Washington, D.C.: A Guide to the Nation's Capital. New York: Hastings House, 1942.

External links

Catholic Cemeteries of the Archdiocese of Washington: Mount Olivet
BillionGraves: Mount Olivet Cemetery

Roman Catholic cemeteries in Washington, D.C.
 
1858 establishments in Washington, D.C.
Rural cemeteries